American singer Terence Trent D'Arby has released 12 studio albums, four greatest hits compilation albums, four live albums, one extended play, and 31 singles. D'Arby has earned one platinum album. His début album Introducing the Hardline According to Terence Trent D'Arby (1987) peaked at number 4 in the US, and while receiving positive reviews, it became a huge success in Europe. The album featured the number 1 single "Wishing Well", which sold over 500,000 copies and was certified gold by the Recording Industry Association of America. Follow up albums were less successful. After Columbia Records parted ways with the artist in the mid-1990s, D'Arby later changed his stage name to Sananda Maitreya. He went on to release 8 studio albums, and 4 live albums, under his own independent record label Treehouse Publishing.

Albums

Studio albums

Compilation albums

Live albums

Extended plays
 Neon Messiah (1993)

Singles

Music videos
1987: "If You Let Me Stay"
1987: "Wishing Well"
1987: "Sign Your Name"
1987: "Dance Little Sister"
1989: "To Know Someone Deeply Is to Know Someone Softly"
1989: "This Side of Love"
1989: "Billy Don't Fall"
1993: "She Kissed Me"
1993: "Do You Love Me Like You Say?"
1993: "Delicate"
1993: "Let Her Down Easy"
1995: "Holding on to You"
1995: "Vibrator"
2001: "O Divina"
2001: "O Divina" (Japan version)
2005: "Bella Faccina"
2007: "Southside Run"
2013: "Kangaroo"
2014: "Siamo Qui"
2015: "Blanket on the Ground"
2015: "Giraffe" (Lyric video)
2016: "Metamorpheus"
2016: "Glad She's Gone" (Lyric video)
2017: "It's Been a Long Time"
2017: "Hail Mary"
2018: "The Birds Are Singing" (Pandora's Version)
2018: "Hail Mary" (Pandora's Version)

References

Discographies of American artists
Discography
Rhythm and blues discographies
Rock music discographies
Pop music discographies